The tabular bones are a pair of triangular flat bones along the rear edge of the skull which form pointed structures known as tabular horns in primitive Teleostomi.

References

Fish anatomy
Amphibian anatomy